Amalosia is a genus of lizards in the family Diplodactylidae. The genus is endemic to Australia. It includes four species:

Taxonomy
All species of the genus Amalosia were previously included within the genus Oedura until 2012, when Oliver et al. transferred four species to this genus and erected two new monotypic genera, Hesperoedura for Oedura reticulata and Nebulifera for Oedura robusta. Some taxonomic authorities still place all four species in the former genus. All species are native to Australia.

Species
The following four species are recognized as being valid.
Amalosia jacovae 
Amalosia lesueurii 
Amalosia obscura 
Amalosia rhombifer 

Nota bene: A binomial authority in parentheses indicates that the species was originally described in a genus other than Amalosia.

References

 
Geckos of Australia
Lizard genera
Taxa named by Richard Walter Wells
Taxa named by Cliff Ross Wellington